Citizen Saint: The Life of Mother Cabrini is a 1947 film about a Catholic saint. It was directed by Harold Young. It was produced by Clyde Elliott Attractions. It is about Frances Xavier Cabrini, an Italian woman who becomes a nun and is eventually sainted. The film includes songs.

Cast
Rev. E. V. Dailey (narrator)
Carla Dare as Francesca "Cecchina" Cabrini (later Mother Cabrini)
Jed Prouty as Neil Hartley
Loraine Mae Martin as Rhea
Walter Butterworth as Junior
Robin Morgan as Cecchina Cabrini
Maurice Cavell as Anton
William Harrigan as Father Vail
June Harrison as Dorine
Lucille Fenton as Antonia Tondini
Lauretta Campeau as Salesia
June DuFrayne as Veronica

Reception 
A review in Variety read, "Carla Dare plays the title role and does well by it. Best sequence is that in which she miraculously recalls Julie Hayden [sic], as sister Delfina, from death... Photography by Don Malkames and other credits are okay".

Grace Kingsley of The Los Angeles Times noted that it "makes up in sympathy in honesty what it lacks in so-called glamour," and continued, "Though the scenes of the picture are episodic, an impressive story is managed and the great woman's character is vividly limned". Kingsley also praised Dare's "moving, sensitive characterization as Cabrini" and predicted a great career for Dare.

References

Films about Christianity
1947 films